Luísa Dacosta (16 February 1927, in Vila Real as Maria Luísa Pinto Saraiva dos Santos –  15 February 2015, in Matosinhos) was a Portuguese writer. In 2010 she was awarded the Vergílio Ferreira Prize by the University of Evora.

From 1944 to 1947 she attended the Faculty of Arts on the University of Lisbon, where she completed the course of history and philosophy. In 1955 she published her first book, Província, which contains a preface, three stories and seven original illustrations by the painter Carlos Botelho. In the field of tales, she also wrote Vovó Ana, Bisavó Filomena e Eu in 1969 and Corpo Recusado in 1985. She has also published two chronicles, A-Ver-o-Mar in 1980 and Morrer a Ocidente in 1990. The chronicles take place in the village of A-Ver-o-Mar, belonging to Vila do Conde. She also wrote the short story taking place in this village, Nos Jardins do Mar in 1983 with original illustrations by Jorge Pinheiro, and even a poetry book A Maresia eo Sargaço dos Dias in 2002. Her diary, considered essential to the understanding of her work, was published in two volumes, Na Água do Tempo and Um Olhar Naufragado. She also wrote a small anthology of texts, Infância e Palavra in 2001 and novel O Planeta Desconhecido e Romance da que Fui Antes de Mim in 2000.

Bibliography

Fiction
1955 - Província
1969 - Vovó Ana, Bisavó Filomena e Eu
1980 - A-Ver-o-Mar
1981 - Nos Jardins do Mar
1985 - Corpo Recusado
1990 - Morrer a Ocidente
1995 - Os Magos Que Não Chegaram a Belém
2000 - O Planeta Desconhecido e Romance da que Fui Antes de Mim
2002 - Natal com Aleluia

Poetry
2001 - Infância e Palavra
2002 - A Maresia e o Sargaço dos Dias
2004 - Árvore
2006 - As suas raízes estão na terra

Diaries
1992 - Na Água do Tempo
2002 - Um Olhar Naufragado

Essays
1959 - Aspectos do Burguesismo Literário
1960 - Notas de Crítica Literária
1974 - O Valor Pedagógico da Sessão de Leitura
1983 - Prefácio a Raúl Brandão
1985 - A Batalha de Aljubarrota
Books for children
" O Elefante cor de Rosa"
"Menina Coração de Pássaro"
"Robertices"
"A rapariga e o sonho"
"História com recadinho"
"O ratinho poeta"

References

1927 births
People from Vila Real, Portugal
2015 deaths
20th-century Portuguese women writers
20th-century Portuguese writers
University of Lisbon alumni
21st-century Portuguese women writers
Portuguese women essayists
Portuguese women poets
Portuguese women short story writers
Portuguese short story writers
Portuguese essayists